Cetatea Albă County was a county (județ) of Romania between 1925 and 1938 and between 1941 and 1944, in Bessarabia, with the capital city at Cetatea Albă.

Geography
The county was located in the eastern part of Greater Romania, in the south of the historical region of Bessarabia. Currently, the territory of the former county is partly administered by Odessa Oblast of Ukraine. It was bordered to the west by Cahul County, to the north by Tighina County, to the south by Ismail County, to the east by the Odessa Oblast of the USSR, and in the southeast the county bordered the Black Sea.

Administration

The county originally consisted of six districts (plăși):
Plasa Cazaci, headquartered at 
Plasa Tarutino, headquartered at Tarutina
Plasa Tașlâc, headquartered at Arciz
Plasa Tatar-Bunar, headquartered at Tatar-Bunar
Plasa Tuzla, headquartered at Cetatea Albă
Plasa Volintiri, headquartered at Volințiri

Subsequently, the territory of the county was reorganized into eight districts:
Plasa Arciz, headquartered at Arciz
Plasa Cazaci, headquartered at 
Plasa Ivăneștii-Noi, headquartered at Ivăneștii Noi
Plasa Liman, headquartered at Cetatea Albă
Plasa Sărata, headquartered at Bairamcea
Plasa Tarutino, headquartered at Tarutina
Plasa Tuzla, headquartered at 
Plasa Volintiri, headquartered at Volințiri

Coat of arms
The Coat of Arms featured a tree on the sinister and the fortress of Cetatea Albă on the dexter.

Population

According to the Romanian census of 1930 the population of Cetatea Albă County was 340,459, of which 20.9% were ethnic Bulgarians, 20.5% ethnic Ukrainians, 18.5% Romanians, 17.3% Russians 16.3% ethnic Germans, 3.3% Jews, 3.3% Gagauz and 0.1% Armenians. Classified by religion: 79.0% were Orthodox Christian, 16.3% Lutheran, 4.7% Jews.

History

After the Union of Bessarabia with Romania in 1918, the county belonged to Romania, which set up the county formally in 1925.

After the 1938 Administrative and Constitutional Reform, this county merged with the counties of Lăpușna, Orhei and Tighina to form Ținutul Nistru.

The area county of the county was occupied by the Soviet Union in 1940 and became part of the Ukrainian SSR. The area returned to Romanian administration as the Bessarabia Governorate following the Axis invasion of the Soviet Union in July 1941. A military administration was established and the region's Jewish population was either executed on the spot or deported to Transnistria, where further numbers were killed. As the Soviet Union's offensive pushed the Axis powers back, the area again was under Soviet control. On September 12, 1944, Romania signed the Moscow Armistice with the Allies. The Armistice, as well as the subsequent peace treaty of 1947, confirmed the Soviet-Romanian border as it was on January 1, 1941. The area of the county became part of the Ukrainian SSR and eventually of the independent Ukraine after the dissolution of the Soviet Union in 1991.

References

External links

  Județul Cetatea Alba (Romanian)

 
Former counties of Romania
Counties of Bessarabia
1925 establishments in Romania
1938 disestablishments in Romania
1941 establishments in Romania
1944 disestablishments in Romania
States and territories established in 1925
States and territories disestablished in 1938
States and territories established in 1941
States and territories disestablished in 1944